DNA ligase 4 is an enzyme that in humans is encoded by the LIG4 gene.

Function 

The protein encoded by this gene is an ATP-dependent DNA ligase that joins double-strand breaks during the non-homologous end joining pathway of double-strand break repair.  It is also essential for V(D)J recombination.  Lig4 forms a complex with XRCC4, and further interacts with the DNA-dependent protein kinase (DNA-PK) and XLF/Cernunnos, which are also required for NHEJ.  The crystal structure of the Lig4/XRCC4 complex has been resolved. Defects in this gene are the cause of LIG4 syndrome.  The yeast homolog of Lig4 is Dnl4.

LIG4 Syndrome
In humans, deficiency of DNA ligase 4 results in a clinical condition known as LIG4 syndrome.  This syndrome is characterized by cellular radiation sensitivity, growth retardation, developmental delay, microcephaly, facial dysmorphisms, increased disposition to leukemia, variable degrees of immunodeficiency and reduced number of blood cells.

Haematopoietic stem cell aging
Accumulation of DNA damage leading to stem cell exhaustion is regarded as an important aspect of aging.  Deficiency of lig4 in pluripotent stem cells impairs Non-homologous end joining (NHEJ) and results in accumulation of DNA double-strand breaks and enhanced apoptosis.  Lig4 deficiency in the mouse causes a progressive loss of haematopoietic stem cells and bone marrow cellularity during aging.  The sensitivity of haematopoietic stem cells to lig4 deficiency suggests that lig4-mediated NHEJ is a key determinant of the ability of stem cells to maintain themselves against physiological stress over time.

Interactions 

LIG4 has been shown to interact with XRCC4 via its BRCT domain. This interaction stabilizes LIG4 protein in cells; cells that are deficient for XRCC4, such as XR-1 cells, have reduced levels of LIG4.

Mechanism
LIG4 is an ATP-dependent DNA ligase.  LIG4 uses ATP to adenylate itself and then transfers the AMP group to the 5' phosphate of one DNA end.  Nucleophilic attack by the 3' hydroxyl group of a second DNA end and release of AMP yield the ligation product.   Adenylation of LIG4 is stimulated by XRCC4 and XLF.

References

Further reading 

 
 
 
 
 
 
 
 
 
 
 
 
 
 
 
 
 
 
 

DNA repair